Bracy Wardell Walker (born November 28, 1970) is a former American football safety in the National Football League. In his 12-year career that started in 1994, Walker played for the Kansas City Chiefs, the Cincinnati Bengals, the Miami Dolphins, and the Detroit Lions.

College career
Walker played college football at the University of North Carolina where he was first-team All-American in his senior year. Bracey Walker graduated from Pine Forest High School in Fayetteville, NC in 1989.

NFL career
Walker currently has the second longest return of a blocked field goal, making a 92-yard run for a touchdown in a 2004 game against the Chicago Bears. Walker was a backup for most of the 2005 season, starting the final four games of the regular season after starting safety Terrence Holt was injured.

External links
Detroit Lions biography

1970 births
Living people
Sportspeople from Portsmouth, Virginia
Players of American football from Virginia
American football safeties
North Carolina Tar Heels football players
Kansas City Chiefs players
Cincinnati Bengals players
Miami Dolphins players
Detroit Lions players